is a sub-kilometer asteroid that orbits near Mars's  Lagrangian point, on average trailing 60° behind it. Its orbit is highly stable, and was originally thought to be spectroscopically similar to 5261 Eureka, suggesting they may both be primordial Martian asteroids.

Spectroscopic observations through 2007 indicate that it has a large proportion of metal and achondrites on its surface (either with or without a mesosiderite contribution); which could also indicate that the surface regolith has undergone space weathering. These observations also reveal differences in the spectra with 5261 Eureka, suggesting they may not be related to each other after all.

See also 
 5261 Eureka (1990 MB)

References

External links 
 

101429
101429
101429
19981113